Kherali is a village in Surendranagar district in the Indian state of Gujarat. It comes on the way from Surendranagar to Limli, and this route leads to Muli. It has population close to 6,000-10,000. The village is grown around one abandoned palace. The village has got one big lake and many other wells including one step-well. It has few temples including two Swaminarayan temple, Rama temple, krishna temple, shaktimaa temple and one well-built mosque. There     
are also government and one private school also . The village is mostly surrounded by farms. The population mostly depend on farming, and young generation go for jobs and business to Surendranagar and around cities. The main crops are wheat, cotton, ground-nuts, and sesames.

Villages in Surendranagar district